Romedy Now is an India based English language television channel showing romantic comedy Hollywood films and shows. The channel, owned by the Bennett, Coleman and Co. Ltd, went on air and began telecasting from 22 September 2013. Its tag line is "Love Laugh Live".

Romedy Now HD

Romedy Now's HD counterpart was earlier known as Romedy Now+, was launched along with Romedy Now, which was renamed Romedy Now HD later and shut down on 1 August 2021.

See also
 Movies Now

References

Movie channels in India
Television channels and stations established in 2013
English-language television stations in India
Television stations in Mumbai
Television channels of The Times Group
2013 establishments in Maharashtra